The 2018 Northern Illinois Huskies football team represented Northern Illinois University as a member of the West Division of the Mid-American Conference (MAC) during the 2018 NCAA Division I FBS football season. Led by Rod Carey in his sixth and final season as head coach, the Huskies compiled an overall record of 8–6 with a mark of 6–2 in conference play, winning the MAC's West Division title. Northern Illinois advanced to the MAC Championship Game, where they defeated East Division champion Buffalo to win the program's fifth MAC championship. The Huskies were invited to the Boca Raton Bowl, where they lost to UAB. The team played home games at Huskie Stadium in DeKalb, Illinois.

Previous season
The Huskies finished the 2017 season 8–5, 6–2 in MAC play to finish in a tie for second place in the West Division. The Huskies received an invitation to the Quick Lane Bowl, their 11th bowl game in the previous 14 years. There they lost to Duke 36–14.

Preseason

Award watch lists

Preseason media poll
The MAC released their preseason media poll on July 24, 2018, with the Huskies predicted to finish as champions of the West Division.

Schedule

Game summaries

at Iowa

Utah

|}

Central Michigan

|}

at Florida State

|}

at Eastern Michigan

|}

at Ball State

|}

Ohio

|}

at BYU

|}

at Akron

|}

Toledo

|}

Miami (OH)

|}

at Western Michigan

|}

vs Buffalo (MAC Championship Game)

|}

vs UAB (Boca Raton Bowl)

|}

Coaching staff

Players drafted into the NFL

References

Northern Illinois
Northern Illinois Huskies football seasons
Mid-American Conference football champion seasons
Northern Illinois Huskies football